Chavarzaq (also Romanized as Chevarzagh and Chavarzagh; also known as Chavarzakī and Chūrzaq) is a city in Chavarzaq District of Tarom County, Zanjan province, Iran. At the 2006 census, its population was 1,343 in 377 households. The following census in 2011 counted 1,753 people in 459 households. The latest census in 2016 showed a population of 1,733 people in 532 households.

References 

Tarom County

Cities in Zanjan Province

Populated places in Zanjan Province

Populated places in Tarom County